Carlo Volpi (born February 8, 1941 in Sampierdarena) is a retired Italian professional football player.

1941 births
Living people
Italian footballers
Serie A players
A.C. Monza players
A.C. Reggiana 1919 players
Palermo F.C. players
Mantova 1911 players
Juventus F.C. players
Brescia Calcio players
A.C. Perugia Calcio players
Parma Calcio 1913 players
S.S.D. Lucchese 1905 players
Association football midfielders
People from Sampierdarena